Máire Hoctor (born 20 January 1963) is a former Irish Fianna Fáil politician.  She was a Teachta Dála (TD) for the Tipperary North constituency from 2002 to 2011.

She was educated at St. Mary's secondary school, Nenagh and St Patrick's College, Maynooth (B.A. Th., H. DipEd.). Before her election she worked as a secondary school teacher in St. Joseph's CBS, Nenagh.

Hoctor was first elected to Dáil Éireann as a Fianna Fáil TD for Tipperary North at the 2002 general election. She was re-elected at the 2007 general election. She is a former member of North Tipperary County Council and of Nenagh Town Council.

Hoctor was a member of various Oireachtas Committees at different stages in the 2002–07 Fianna Fáil–Progressive Democrats government.

In 2007, legislation was passed to increase the number of Ministers of State from 17 to 20, and in July 2007 Hoctor was nominated by Bertie Ahern to be appointed by the government as Minister of State at the Department of Social and Family Affairs, at the Department of Health and Children, and at the Department of the Environment, Heritage and Local Government, with special responsibility for Older People. She was re-appointed to the same positions in 2008, but in April 2009, she was not re-appointed, after Brian Cowen requested the resignation of all Ministers of State to reduce the number from 20 to 15.

She lost her seat at the 2011 general election.

References

1963 births
Living people
Alumni of St Patrick's College, Maynooth
Fianna Fáil TDs
Irish schoolteachers
Local councillors in North Tipperary
Members of the 29th Dáil
Members of the 30th Dáil
21st-century women Teachtaí Dála
Ministers of State of the 30th Dáil
Politicians from County Tipperary
Women ministers of state of the Republic of Ireland